The 1993 Artemio Franchi Cup was the second edition of the CONMEBOL–UEFA Cup of Champions, a football match between the winners of the previous South American and European championships. The match featured Argentina, winners of the 1991 Copa América, and Denmark, winners of UEFA Euro 1992. It was played at Estadio José María Minella in Mar del Plata, Argentina, on 24 February 1993.

Argentina won the match 5–4 on penalties following a 1–1 draw after extra time to win their first Artemio Franchi Cup title. It would be the last trophy Diego Maradona won with Argentina.

Teams

Match

Details

References

External links

 Artemio Franchi Trophy 1993 at RSSSF
 Match report at FootballDatabase.eu
 Match report at 11v11.com

1993
1992–93 in European football
1993 in South American football
1992–93 in Argentine football
Argentina national football team matches
1992–93 in Danish football
Denmark national football team matches
International association football competitions hosted by Argentina
February 1993 sports events in South America
Sport in Mar del Plata
Association football penalty shoot-outs